Brandon Moore (born June 21, 1970) is a former professional American football player who played offensive lineman for three seasons for the New England Patriots.

References

1970 births
American football offensive linemen
New England Patriots players
Duke Blue Devils football players
Living people
People from Ardmore, Pennsylvania
Players of American football from Pennsylvania
Sportspeople from Montgomery County, Pennsylvania